Yacoubian Building may refer to:

The Yacoubian Building, a 2002 novel by Alaa Al Aswany
The Yacoubian Building (film), a 2006 Egyptian film based on the novel
The Yacoubian Building (TV series), a 2007 Egyptian TV series based on the novel
Yacoubian Building (Cairo), a building in Egypt on which the novel is based
Yacoubian Building (Beirut), a building in Lebanon